Clara Blandick (born Clara Blanchard Dickey; June 4, 1876 – April 15, 1962) was an American character, film, stage and theater actress. She played Aunt Em in Metro-Goldwyn-Mayer's The Wizard of Oz (1939).
As a character actress, she often played eccentric elderly matriarchs.

Early life
She was born Clara Blanchard Dickey, the daughter of Isaac B. and Hattie (née Mudgett) Dickey, aboard the Willard Mudgett – an American ship captained by her father (named after one of her maternal relatives), and docked in Victoria Harbour, British Hong Kong. She was delivered by Captain William H. Blanchard, whose ship, Wealthy Pendleton, was anchored nearby.  His wife, Clara Pendleton Blanchard, was also present.  To thank the Blanchards, Captain and Mrs. Dickey named their daughter Clara Blanchard Dickey.  When she became successful as an actress, she took the first syllable of "Blanchard" and the first syllable of "Dickey" to create her stage name, "Clara Blandick". While she often used 1880 as her year of birth for professional purposes, she was actually born in 1876. According to the newspaper Daily Alta California, both the Willard Mudgett and the Wealthy Pendleton were in Hong Kong Harbor in June 1876. By 1880, Captain Dickey was in command of a different ship (the William Hales), and the rest of the family was in Quincy, Massachusetts.

Her parents had settled in Quincy, Massachusetts, in 1879 or 1880. Sources vary on when the Dickeys settled there, and Clara may have been two or three years old when they made the move. In nearby Boston she met the Shakespearean actor E. H. Sothern, with whom she appeared in a production of Richard Lovelace. She moved from Boston to New York City by 1900, and began pursuing acting as a career.

Acting
In 1897, Blandick was an understudy with The Walking Delegate company in Boston and her stage debut came in that production at the Tremont Theatre. In 1901, she portrayed Jehanneton in the play If I Were King, which ran for 56 performances at Garden Theatre (an early component of Madison Square Garden). She achieved acclaim for her role in The Christian.

In 1903, she played Gwendolyn in the Broadway premiere of E. W. Hornung's Raffles The Amateur Cracksman opposite Kyrle Bellew. She started in pictures with the Kalem company in 1908 and made a number of appearances such as in The Maid's Double in 1911. Blandick finally broke onto Broadway in 1912, when she was cast as Dolores Pennington in Widow By Proxy which ran for 88 performances through early 1913 at George M. Cohan's Theatre on Broadway. During this same period she appeared on stages throughout the Northeastern United States as a member of Sylvester Poli's stock theater company, The Poli Players. She continued to achieve acclaim for her stage work, playing a number of starring roles, including the lead in Madame Butterfly. By 1914, she was back on the silver screen, as Emily Mason in the film Mrs. Black is Back.

During World War I, Blandick performed some overseas volunteer work for the American Expeditionary Force in France. She also continued to act on stage and occasionally in silent pictures. In 1924, she earned rave reviews for her supporting role in the Pulitzer Prize winning play Hell-Bent Fer Heaven, which ran for 122 performances at the Klaw Theatre in New York (later renamed CBS Radio Playhouse No. 2).

In 1929, Blandick moved to Hollywood. By the 1930s, she was well known in theatrical and film circles as an established supporting actress. Though she landed roles like Aunt Polly in the 1930 film Tom Sawyer (a role she reprised in the 1931 film Huckleberry Finn), she spent much of the decade as a character actor, often going uncredited. In Pre-Code films she often played mothers, including those of characters played by Joan Crawford (Possessed) and Joan Blondell (Three on a Match). At a time when many actors were permanently attached to a single studio, she played a wide number of bit parts for almost every major Hollywood studio (though she would later be under contract with 20th Century Fox). In 1930, she acted in nine films. In 1931 she was in thirteen films. As is the case with some other busy character actors, it is difficult to make an exact tally of the films in which Blandick appeared, but a reasonable estimate would fall between 150 and 200.

The Wizard of Oz and later years
In 1939, Blandick landed her most memorable minor role – Aunt Em in MGM's classic The Wizard of Oz. Though it was a small part (Blandick filmed all her scenes in a single week), the character was an important symbol of protagonist Dorothy's quest to return home to her beloved aunt and uncle. (Aunt Em and Uncle Henry are the only characters from the beginning of the movie, in black-and-white Kansas, not to have alter ego characters in the Land of Oz.) Blandick beat May Robson, Janet Beecher, and Sarah Padden for the role, and earned $750 per week. Some believed Aunt Em's alter ego was to be Glinda, the Good Witch of the North but the studio opted to use different actresses for each role. The reason was they wanted someone younger looking to contrast the good witch from the bad witches, although Billie Burke, who played Glinda, was only eight years younger. Blandick is only credited in the movie's closing credits.

After The Wizard of Oz, Blandick returned to her staple of character acting in supporting and bit roles. She would continue to act in a wide variety of roles in dozens of films. She played Mrs. Morton Pringle in 1940's Anne of Windy Poplars, a department store customer in the 1941 Marx Brothers film The Big Store, a fashionable socialite in the 1944 musical Can't Help Singing, and a cold-blooded murderer in the 1947 mystery Philo Vance Returns. Her final two roles both came in 1950 – playing a housekeeper and a landlady in Key to the City and Love That Brute, respectively. She retired from acting at the age of 74 and went into seclusion at the Hollywood Roosevelt Hotel.

Personal life and death
Blandick was married on December 7, 1905, in Manhattan, to mining engineer Harry Stanton Elliott. Prior to his mining career, he had been an actor, and they had starred together in The Christian. They separated by 1910, and are believed to have divorced in 1912. They had no children.

Throughout the 1950s, Blandick's health steadily began to deteriorate. Her eyesight began to fail and she was suffering from severe, painful arthritis. On April 15, 1962, she returned home from Palm Sunday services at her church. She began rearranging her room, placing her favorite photos and memorabilia in prominent places. She laid out her resume and a collection of press clippings from her lengthy career. She dressed immaculately in an elegant royal blue dressing gown, and with her hair properly styled, she took an overdose of sleeping pills. She lay down on a couch, covered herself with a gold blanket over her shoulders, and tied a plastic bag over her head. She left the following note: “I am now about to make the great adventure. I cannot endure this agonizing pain any longer. It is all over my body. Neither can I face the impending blindness. I pray the Lord my soul to take. Amen.”

Blandick's landlady, Helen Mason, discovered her body later that day. Her ashes were interred at the Great Mausoleum, Columbarium of Security at Forest Lawn Memorial Park, Glendale along with those of her sister, Marcia D. Young, and Marcia's husband, George A. Young. Blandick's ashes lie just yards from those of Charley Grapewin, her on-screen husband in The Wizard of Oz.

Stage credits
Note: The list below is limited to New York/Broadway theatrical productions.

Filmography

References
Chicago Daily Tribune, Clara Real 'Ship's Daughter''', January 30, 1910.
Los Angeles Times, Actress Clara Blandick Plays Farewell Scene'', April 16, 1962, Page A1.

Footnotes

Further reading

External links

 
 
 
 
 
 Portrait gallery(NYPublic Library, Billy Rose collection)

1876 births
1962 suicides
American film actresses
American silent film actresses
American stage actresses
Burials at Forest Lawn Memorial Park (Glendale)
Drug-related suicides in California
People from Quincy, Massachusetts
Actresses from Massachusetts
20th-century American actresses
20th Century Studios contract players
Metro-Goldwyn-Mayer contract players
Female suicides
American expatriates in British Hong Kong